Time Shard were one of the innovators in underground UK electronic dance music during the 'second summer of love' in 1989.  During their first five years Gobber, Psi and Steven Angstrom became known as one of the UK's first live 'acid house' acts, during this time they developed a sound which (later) became known as Psychedelic trance although at the time they were often described as producing Ambient or Shamanic Trance music.

Their early music was a synthesis of dub with the pulsating sounds of Kraftwerk and on slower pieces the influence of Brian Eno is in evidence. Their signature sound of analogue synthesizers, sequencers and drum machines overlaid with glissando guitars and an electric sitar player became popular as  music magazine publishers struggled to deal with the new rift between rock and roll and the burgeoning house music.   Time Shard built a devoted following among the mixture of punks and Acid House followers which flocked to Britain's fields during this period.

Their initial successes were on the UK's free - festival circuit, which was in a period of transition and fusion as acid house fans found a place to dance (initially) without restriction, outside mainstream club culture, which had yet to develop the 'superclubs' such as Cream.

In later years (1996- ) they fell victim to the UK's criminal justice bill which killed many venues, this, combined with the fragile financial health of their record company Planet Dog urged them to take to the web, where they became one of the first groups to attempt distribution of MP3 files, striking a deal with webmusic distribution pioneers e-music.

In recent years they have been quiet, but still maintain a web page at http://www.timeshard.com.

Releases

EP
Zero (Planet Dog 1995)

Album
Who Pilots The Flying Saucers? (Self Released Cassette only 1991)
Hypoborean Dome Temples Of Apollo (Self Released Recorded Live for "The Late World Noise" 1992)
Crystal Oscillations (Planet Dog 1994)
Hunab Ku (Planet Dog 1996)
Live (Neo)

Some of these are available from the Planet Dog records website at www.planetdogrecords.com

Notes

External links
TimeShard.com
Planet Dog Records website
John Peel sessions on BBC radio 1
NME

Ambient musicians